The Omaha Jaycee Open was a golf tournament on the LPGA Tour from 1964 to 1965. It was played at the Miracle Hills Golf Club in Omaha, Nebraska.

Winners
Omaha Jaycee Open
1965 Clifford Ann Creed

Omaha Jaycee Open Invitational
1964 Ruth Jessen

References

Former LPGA Tour events
Golf in Nebraska
Sports in Omaha, Nebraska
History of women in Nebraska